Pediatric endocrinology (British: Paediatric)  is a medical subspecialty dealing with disorders of the endocrine glands, such as variations of physical growth and sexual development in childhood, diabetes and many more.

By age, pediatric endocrinologists, depending upon the age range of the patients they treat, care for patients from infancy to late adolescence and young adulthood.

The most common disease of the specialty is type 1 diabetes, which usually accounts for at least 50% of a typical clinical practice. The next most common problem is growth disorders, especially those amenable to growth hormone treatment. Pediatric endocrinologists are usually the primary physicians involved in the medical care of infants and children with intersex disorders. The specialty also deals with hypoglycemia and other forms of hyperglycemia in childhood, variations of puberty, as well other adrenal, thyroid, and pituitary problems. Many pediatric endocrinologists have interests and expertise in bone metabolism, lipid metabolism, adolescent gynecology, or inborn errors of metabolism.

In the United States and Canada, pediatric endocrinology is a subspecialty of the American Board of Pediatrics or the American Osteopathic Board of Pediatrics, with board certification following fellowship training. It is a relatively small and primarily cognitive specialty, with few procedures and an emphasis on diagnostic evaluation.

Most pediatric endocrinologists in North America and many from around the world can trace their professional genealogy to Lawson Wilkins, who pioneered the specialty in the pediatrics department of Johns Hopkins School of Medicine and the Harriet Lane Home in Baltimore in between the late 1940s and the mid-1960s.

The principal North American professional association was originally named the Lawson Wilkins Pediatric Endocrine Society, now renamed the Pediatric Endocrine Society. Other longstanding pediatric endocrine associations include the European Society for Paediatric Endocrinology, the British Society for Paediatric Endocrinology, the Australasian Paediatric Endocrine Group and the Japanese Society for Pediatric Endocrinology. Professional associations of the specialty continue to proliferate.

Training for pediatric endocrinology consists of a 3-year fellowship following completion of a 3-year pediatrics residency. The fellowship, and the specialty, are heavily research-oriented and academically based, although less exclusively now than in past decades.

See also 
 Robert Lustig, an American pediatric endocrinologist
 Melvin Grumbach, an American pediatric endocrinologist

References

 

Endocrinology, Pediatric
Endocrinology